The 1995–96 League Cup was the twenty-fifth and final season of the rugby league League Cup, known for sponsorship purposes as the Regal Trophy.

The last final was won by Wigan, who beat local rivals St. Helens 25-16 at the McAlpine Stadium in Huddersfield. The attendance was 17,590.

Background 
This season saw a reduction in the  number of entrants, the number decreasing to forty-two.

The inclusion of two French clubs continued, but the number of invitations to the top junior clubs was reduced by six from eleven last season, to just five this season.

The ten first round winners added to the twenty-two clubs given byes, gave a total of entrants into the second round of thirty-two.
There were no drawn matches during this season's competition

Competition and results

Round 1 (a preliminary round) 

Involved  10 matches and 20 clubs with 22 byes

Round 2 
Involved 16 matches and 32 clubs

Round 3 
Involved  8 matches and 16 clubs

Round 4 - quarterfinals 
Involved 4 matches with 8 clubs

Round 5 – semifinals 

Involved 2 matches and 4 clubs

Round 5 – semifinal replays  
Involved  1 match and 2 clubs

Final

Teams and scorers 

Scoring - Try = four points - Goal = two points - Drop goal = one

Prize money 
As part of the sponsorship deal and funds, the  prize money awarded to the competing teams for this season is as follows :-

The road to success 
This tree excludes any First round fixtures

Notes and comments 
1 * AS Saint Estève was a French rugby league team from Perpignan, which in 2000 it merged with nearby neighbours XIII Catalan to form Union Treiziste Catalaneto compete in the Super Leagueas the Catalans Dragons.
2 * Pia are a French League Club playing at Stade Daniel-Ambert 
3 * Park Amateurs were a Junior (amateur) club from Halifax
4 * Woolston Rovers are a Junior (amateur) club from Warrington, becoming Warrington Woolston Rovers in 2003 and Warrington Wizards in 2002. the ground is the old Warrington Home Ground of Wilderspool 
5 * RUGBYLEAGUEproject gives the venue as Clarence Street, York. At the time Bramley were playing their home matches at Clarence Field, Kirkstall, Leeds
6 * Doncaster Dragons were now playing at Belle Vue
7 * Hemel Stags are a semi professional club based in Hemel Hempstead and playing at the Pennine Way stadium (capacity 2000)
8 * Ellenborough Rangers are a Junior (amateur) club from the Ellenborough suburb of Maryport, Cumbria
9 * West Hull are a Junior (amateur) club from Hull
10 * RUGBYLEAGUEproject gives the venue as Clarence Street, York. At the time Bramley were playing their home matches at Clarence Field, Kirkstall, Leeds
11 * RUGBYLEAGUEproject gives the attendance as 4,180, but Hull official archives gives 4,180 and St Helens official archives give 5,102
12 * after extra time - 16-16 at full time
13 * Postponed due to heavy frost. This match would have been televised by BBC but the replayed game wasn't shown
14 * Warrington record defeat, at the  time
15 *  This was the last Regal Trophy final. 
16 * St. Helens sacked their coach Eric Hughes following this loss.
17 * St Helens Heritage archives shows Chris Joynt as numbered position 12, whereas Wigan official archives shows the  player as No 11
18 * St Helens Heritage archives shows Simon Booth as numbered position 11, whereas Wigan official archives shows the  player as No 12
19 * St Helens Heritage archives shows Vila Matautia as numbered position 15, whereas Wigan official archives shows the  player as No 14
20 * St Helens Heritage archives shows Andy Northey (for Anthony Sullivan 47 min) as numbered position 14, whereas Wigan official archives shows the  player as No 15
21  * The McAlpine Stadium is the home ground of Huddersfield Town and Super League side, Huddersfield Giants. The stadium is 40% owned by Kirklees Metropolitan Council and 60% by the two clubs, hosted its first match in August 1994 and seats 24,499 people along with hospitality boxes and conference rooms. Since opening the stadium has been sponsored by/known as the Alfred McAlpine Stadium, and more lately the Galpharm Stadium/John Smith's Stadium, and is a multi-use sports stadium in Huddersfield in West Yorkshire, England.

General information for those unfamiliar 
The council of the Rugby Football League voted to introduce a new competition, to be similar to The Football Association and Scottish Football Association's "League Cup". It was to be a similar knock-out structure to, and to be secondary to, the Challenge Cup. As this was being formulated, sports sponsorship was becoming more prevalent and as a result John Player and Sons, a division of Imperial Tobacco Company, became sponsors, and the competition never became widely known as the "League Cup" 
The competition ran from 1971-72 until 1995-96 and was initially intended for the professional clubs plus the two amateur BARLA National Cup finalists. In later seasons the entries were expanded to take in other amateur and French teams. The competition was dropped due to "fixture congestion" when Rugby League became a summer sport
The Rugby League season always (until the onset of "Summer Rugby" in 1996) ran from around August-time through to around May-time and this competition always took place early in the season, in the Autumn, with the final usually taking place in late January 
The competition was variably known, by its sponsorship name, as the Player's No.6 Trophy (1971–1977), the John Player Trophy (1977–1983), the John Player Special Trophy (1983–1989), and the Regal Trophy in 1989.

Postscript 
To date, this was the last season for the John Player sponsored trophy competitions, which had taken place annually since its inauguration in the 1971-72 for a period of 25 seasons.
It was unfortunately such a short period for what was intended to be the "League Cup" and that very few of the professional clubs managed to have their name inscribed on the trophy, or even reach the semi-final stage
The reasons given by the ruling body, the Rugby Football League for the  competition's demise, were that  it was deemed the trophy was adding to fixture congestion for more successful sides and a clean sweep was needed to herald the "Summer Rugby" image of the game.

Records from the John Player trophy competition

Entrants and number of cup wins 
This table list all the semi-professional clubs which have entered the competition and reached at least the semi-final stage, the number (and dates) of their cup final wins, cup final runner-up spots, and losing semi-Final appearances.

Note - several stats taken from  records of the now defunct "The  Rugby League Record Keepers Club" documents

See also 
1995-96 Rugby Football League season
Regal Trophy
Rugby league county cups

References

External links
Saints Heritage Society
1896–97 Northern Rugby Football Union season at wigan.rlfans.com 
Hull&Proud Fixtures & Results 1896/1897
Widnes Vikings - One team, one passion Season In Review - 1896-97
The Northern Union at warringtonwolves.org
Huddersfield R L Heritage
Wakefield until I die

League Cup (rugby league)
League Cup (rugby league)
League Cup (rugby league)
League Cup (rugby league)
League Cup (rugby league)